Richard Thomas Brophy Jr. is a United States Navy rear admiral and naval aviator who serves as Chief of Naval Air Training since July 19, 2022. He most recently served as commander of Carrier Strike Group 4 from May 17, 2021 to July 8, 2022. He previously served as commander of the Naval Aviation Warfighting Development Center from May 2019 to May 2021, with commands of Carrier Air Wing 9 from January 2015 to June 2016 and Strike Fighter Squadron (VFA) 115 from 2007 to 2009.

A native of Carmel, California, Brophy was commissioned via the United States Naval Academy in 1991. He earned an M.S. degree in Management from Troy State University and was designated a Naval Aviator in 1994. He graduated from the U.S. Navy Fighter Weapons School (TOPGUN), and later in 2010 earned an M.A. degree in National Security and Strategic Studies from the United States Naval War College.

In February 2023, he was nominated for promotion to rear admiral.

References

Date of birth missing (living people)
Year of birth missing (living people)
People from California
Military personnel from California
United States Naval Academy alumni
Troy University alumni
Naval War College alumni
Recipients of the Legion of Merit
United States Naval Aviators
United States Navy rear admirals (lower half)
Living people